Erika Belle is an American socialite, art curator, fashion designer, and dancer, most known for her friendship and work with pop singer Madonna in the 1980s. She has been featured dancing in Madonna's videos to "Everybody", "True Blue", "Papa Don't Preach", "Lucky Star", and "Holiday". She collaborated on choreography to the videos and live shows, and performed with Madonna in various New York clubs and television programs such as Top of the Pops.

As an influential fashion designer of the time, Belle also created many of Madonna’s outfits and performance costumes. Some of them can be seen in videos to "Everybody", "Like a Virgin", "Burning Up", and "Lucky Star". Belle's clothes were carried in several New York boutiques, such as Fiorucci, and appeared in Vogue, The New Yorker, and Elle magazines.

Belle attended New York University and was the owner of the nightclub Lucky Strike on Ninth Street off Third Avenue in Manhattan. Madonna was briefly a bartender at the nightclub.

References

Madonna Tribe Interviews. "Madonna Tribe meets Maripol" Madonna Tribe (interview with Madonna's friend Maripol)
A Diverse Production. "Madonna: Naked Ambition" (Documentary on Madonna with Erika Belle, part 5/6)
A Diverse Production. "Madonna: Naked Ambition" (Documentary on Madonna with Erika Belle, part 6/6)

External links
Madonna "Everybody" music video Yahoo!
Madonna "Lucky Star" music video MTV
Madonna "Holiday" music video YouTube
Nat Finkelstein's exhibit curated by Erika Belle
Image of the curator on artnet.com

Living people
Year of birth missing (living people)